The Gaeltacht Act 2012 is an Act of the Oireachtas of Ireland. The Act redefined the traditional Irish-speaking areas or Gaeltacht in the Republic of Ireland on linguistic criteria instead of on geographic areas which had been the position until 2012. While the traditional Gaeltacht boundaries still exist the Act sets out ways where areas outside the Gaeltacht can be formally designated as Líonraí Gaeilge (Irish Language Networks) and Bailte Seirbhísí Gaeltachta (Gaeltacht Service Towns). In 2016 it was announced that Galway City, Dingle and Letterkenny would be the first recognised Bailte Seirbhísí Gaeltachta under the Gaeltacht Act 2012 subject to them adopting and implementing approved language plans. In February 2018 the Department of Arts, Heritage and the Gaeltacht and Foras na Gaeilge announced that five areas - The Gaeltacht Quarter in West Belfast, Loughrea, Carn Tóchair, Ennis and Clondalkin Village - were going to be designated as the first formal Líonraí Gaeilge areas under the Act. 
 Foras na Gaeilge have said that they expect the status to be given to other areas also.

The Act also brought the process of the introduction of Language Plans in the Gaeltacht into existence and gave statutory effect to the implementation of the 20-Year Strategy for the Irish Language 2010-2030 by Údarás na Gaeltachta in the Gaeltacht and changed the process by which the board of Údarás na Gaeltachta are elected.

See also

 Gaeltacht Irish speaking regions in Ireland.
 Údarás na Gaeltachta The Gaeltacht Authority.
 Bailte Seirbhíse Gaeltachta Gaeltacht Service Towns.
 Líonraí Gaeilge Irish Language Networks.
 Official Languages Act 2003
 Irish language outside Ireland
 Scottish Gaelic Gaeilge na hAlban / Gàidhlig.
 Gàidhealtachd Scottish Gaelic speaking regions in Scotland.

References

External links
 Gaeltacht Act 2012 from the Irish Statute Book.

2012 in Irish law
Acts of the Oireachtas of the 2010s
Language legislation
Irish language